The Joliet Area Historical Museum is a historical museum located in Joliet, Illinois.  The museum documents the history of Joliet and surrounding Will County.

Description and history
The museum adaptively reuses an urban space formerly occupied by the Ottawa Street Methodist Church, which was designed by Joliet architect G. Julian Barnes and built in 1909.  Located on one of the alternate paths of old historic U.S. Route 66, the museum's modern ground-floor addition features the Route 66 Welcome Center, which presents a permanent exhibit called the Route 66 Experience.  This newer part of the museum also connects to the historic Joliet Chamber of Commerce Clubhouse next door (now known as the Renaissance Center of the City Center campus of Joliet Junior College) and to the JJC Renaissance Center's main dining room, which is staffed by the college's hospitality and culinary school students and open to the public.

During the late 20th century, formerly rural Will County townships grew rapidly, while properties in central city Joliet were threatened.  In 2002, the former church's urban space was reconfigured as a historic museum.  A separate wing is home to an exhibit about the Joliet-raised NASA engineer and JJC graduate John C. Houbolt, honored as the chief conceptualizer of the lunar orbit rendezvous segment of the U.S. Apollo program and the use of a lunar module to shuttle astronauts to and from the surface of the Moon.    

The museum is located at 204 N. Ottawa Street in central Joliet.  An admission fee is charged.

, the museum was seeking to establish guided tours of the landmark former Collins Street Prison for Route 66 travelers and other interested tourists. As of 2018, the museum began providing tours of the Collins Street Prison.

References

History of Joliet, Illinois
Museums in Will County, Illinois
Buildings and structures in Joliet, Illinois
History museums in Illinois
Museums established in 1977
1977 establishments in Illinois